The Monastery of Santa María de Huerta (Spanish: Monasterio de Santa María de Huerta) is a Cistercian monastery located in Santa María de Huerta, a town of the Spanish Province of Soria, within the autonomous community of Castile and León. 
The first stone of the building was laid by Alfonso VII of León and Castile in 1179.

It was declared a national monument in 1882.

History 
Its foundation is due to the king Alfonso VII of León and Castile, in fulfilment of a promise he made in the siege of Coria. For this project, the king brought in 1142, from the abbey of Berdoues in Gascony (France), a community of Cistercian monks, with their abbot Rodulfo, who stayed in a very poor building built in a place called Cántabos, located in the municipality of Fuentelmonge. The chosen place had shortage of water and a transfer to the lands near the Jalón river, which took place in 1162, was decided.

Saint Martin of Hinojosa was the fourth abbot of the monastery. He was named bishop of Sigüenza but resigned and returned to the monastery, where he did great works and transformations until converting the primitive building into another one of greater dimensions and of true Cistercian features, which still persists. Alfonso VII of León and Castile laid the first stone of this new construction on March 20 of 1179. It is believed that the works were made under the direction of the master of the cathedral of Sigüenza. They advanced very quickly thanks to the royal protection and the abundant donations.

One of the great patrons of this monastery was the archbishop of Toledo, Rodrigo Ximénez de Rada, nephew of Martin of Hinojosa. In his testament signed in Paris in April 1201 he ordered that he be buried in said monastery. Throughout the years this center received many donations and alms, constantly enriching its heritage. Many of the concilĭums of the Cistercian Order were held in this place.

Important sponsors were the lords of Molina who chose the monastery for burial, including the first owner of the lordship, the count Manrique Pérez de Lara as well as his son Pedro, both buried, along with other members of their lineage, in the pantheon of the counts of Molina located in the Gothic cloister. The kings Alfonso II of Aragon and Peter II of Aragon were also benefactors of the monastery.

In 1215, Martín Muñoz, mayordomo mayor of Henry I, nephew of the abbot Martin of Hinojosa, paid for the works of the refectory. In the 16th century he obtained aid and benefits from Charles V, Holy Roman Emperor and Philip II of Spain. Other constructions were built and the monastic complex enlarged.

In 1833, according to the Ecclesiastical confiscations of Mendizábal, the monks were expelled and only the church remained as parish. Enrique de Aguilera y Gamboa, marquis of Cerralbo, made an exhaustive study of the entire monument, taking charge of making known the history and inventory of the works of art. Thanks to his work, this monastery could be saved from total ruin. In 1882 it was declared a national monument.

Since 1930, the monastery has been a community of monks of the Cistercian Order of the Strict Observance (Trappists). At present the Abbot of the monastery is Dom Isidoro Anguita and the community is formed by about 24 brothers.

The enclosure 

All the main buildings of the monastery (church, cloister, orchard, bread factory (silo), warehouses, workshops, etc.) are surrounded by a wall with eight crenellated towers. In the 16th century, the entrance was refurbished by ennobling the door in whose pediment an image of the Virgin can be seen. In 1771 the door was enlarged with an upper body that presents another pediment adorned with the vase of lilies, symbol of purity always related to the Virgin Mary. The door gives access to an atrium or square where the Casa Curato is located on the left, originally an abbatial room, general goal and stewards offices. Opposite is the facade of the church with a large rose window whose radii are small columns, and a pointed arch door with smooth moldings and sawtooth moldings. The buildings that make up the monastery proper were built in the 16th century but are mainly from the end of 12th century with some modifications from other centuries the cellar, the refectory of conversi and the church are preserved.

The church 

The foundation stone was laid by Alfonso VII of León and Castile, on March 20, 1179. At the end of the 18th century, classicist works and changes were made. As normal, the building began to be built with the semicircular apse to the east. The works progressed quickly, with the exception of the last four bays of the naves, which were completed in the 13th century. Simple vaults and wooden roof were built in the central nave. All this was replaced in 1632 by lunettes vaults. The central nave was also changed in the 18th century with an added cornice, run on capitals and the iron gate was added (a work of art of ironwork) to isolate the enclosure from the sections destined for the parish. No changes were made to the exterior, where one can see one of the most austere constructions of the Cistercian architecture, with large buttresses in the double wall.

It has a ground plan with three naves and a transept with five apsidal chapels with pointed arches and vaults of simple cross-section. Of the five apses, the one in the center is semicircular and the other four are rectangular, a Cistercian model that was also followed in the Monasterio de Santa María de Matallana (Province of Valladolid).

Interior 
 The high altar is covered by a Baroque altarpiece by Félix Malo (from Calatayud), made in 1766. On both sides of the altarpiece there are some marble urns from Calatorao, from the 17th century, containing the remains of the bishop Ximénez de Rada and abbot Martin of Hinojosa. On the sides of the chapel are the sepulchers of the dukes of Medinaceli, from 1632. On the walls of the presbytery there are large frescoes from the 18th century depicting scenes from the battle of Las Navas de Tolosa.
 In the south arm of the transept you can see two large oil paintings of Alfonso VII and Alfonso VIII, also from the 18th century. There are also two Romanesque sepulchers of the Hinojosa family. The transept gives access to the octagonal chapel of Nuestra Señora del Destierro, built between 1747 and 1750, destined to become a reliquary. There is kept a Romanesque image of the Virgin that according to tradition is the one taken in his saddle by Jiménez de Rada in the battle of Las Navas de Tolosa. The image is a rough and disproportionate work, from the beginning of the 13th century. The copper crosier with cabochons is also kept here, which was found in the sepulcher of Abbot St. Martin of Hinojosa. By the north transept, it is passed to the tower, built in the 12th century, which has a spire added in the 17th century. From the tower one gains access to a chamber that in the 13th century was a chapter house, with entrance from the cloister and that in the 16th century was transformed into sacristy. Further north is the Chapel of Profundis which is reached from the cloister. There the corpses of the monks were exposed and watched until they were buried. Previously it seems that it was a place of work or library. The high choir has a good walnut seating manufactured in the second half of the 16th century.

The refectory 

On the north walk of the cloister is the façade of the refectory, from the 12th century, which has a pediment with rose window and a door with archivolt very similar to the main door of the church. The refectory is the monastery's masterpiece. Construction began in 1215 at the expense of Martín Nuño de Hinojosa, nephew of Abbot Hinojosa. It is a large chamber with sexpartite vaults and with beautiful pointed arched windows that provide a lot of light to the room. In one of the walls the staircase was built into the wall, covered by a vault in ramp, which gives access to the rostrum or pulpit from which a monk read his companions some pious book while they ate. The Spanish art historian Vicente Lampérez y Romea assures that it is the most beautiful and comprehensive example of all the known ones in Spain and that it can very well compete with the most beautiful of monastic Europe. The French historian Elie Lambert makes similar statements.

This refectory communicates with a monumental kitchen that has in the center an immense square oven, supported by four pointed arches, an interesting example of Spanish type.

The cloisters 
From the left nave of the church is accessed, through a door that was opened in the 12th century, the cloister called de los Caballeros; It took this name because it was the burial place of families of the nobility and illustrious people. It is a good example of Cistercian Gothic cloister.

From the lower cloister de los Caballeros one ascends to the top by a magnificent staircase of honor built in 1600, which leads to the high cloister, Renaissance work that began to be built in 1533 and was completed in 1547. The galleries of this cloister have very low arches and balusters and an ornamentation of medallions that give name to each of them:
 Gallery of Kings (from Henry I of Castile)
 Gallery of Apostles
 Gallery of Adalides (military caudillos)
 Gallery of Prophets
Inside these galleries can be seen in certain spaces the busts of some monks of the monastery who stood out for their virtue or for some other issue.

The 12th century library is accessed from the upper cloister. It is a spacious room decorated to the taste of the 17th century. It is known that it kept around 4000 volumes, many of which are conserved in the public library of Soria.

From the lower cloister you can reach the other cloister called de la Hospedería, a work of Herrerian style, built approximately around 1582. One of the sides had rooms for the pilgrims that were going on the Way of St. James.

The chapter house of this cloister is from the 12th century; it was known from old times with the name of stable of Alfonso VIII. Historians consider such a denomination to be a mistake, judging by its structure and ornamentation, but its fate is unknown. In the western wing were the lagar and the granary.

Gallery

References 

Bien de Interés Cultural landmarks in the Province of Soria
Cistercian monasteries in Spain
Trappist monasteries in Spain
Monasteries in Castile and León
16th-century Roman Catholic church buildings in Spain
Gothic architecture in Castile and León